Third Amendment may refer to the:

Third Amendment to the United States Constitution, part of the Bill of Rights, preventing the U.S. government from quartering soldiers in a civilian's home during peacetime without the consent of the civilian, nor in time of war, but in a manner to be prescribed by law
Third Amendment of the Constitution of Ireland, permitted the state to join the European Communities and provided that European law would take precedence over the constitution
Third Amendment of the Constitution Bill 1958, a failed amendment of the Constitution of Ireland concerning the electoral system
Third Amendment of the Constitution Bill 1968, a failed amendment of the Constitution of Ireland concerning apportionment
Third Amendment of the Constitution of South Africa, which allowed the creation of municipalities that crossed provincial boundaries
Australian referendum, 1928 (State Debts), the third amendment to the Constitution of Australia